Derek Henry Junior Duncan (born 23 April 1987) is an English footballer who plays as a winger or as a left back for  VCD Athletic .

Career
Duncan was signed by Grays Athletic on a one-year contract on 25 May 2007, following his release by Leyton Orient. The left-winger left Grays Athletic by mutual consent, just a month after he signed, after his agent offered him to other Football League clubs.

Duncan was signed by Paul Lambert in the summer of 2007 and joined Wycombe Wanderers, where he failed to make a league appearance before having his contract terminated by mutual consent in January 2009.

On the same day it was announced that he had left Wycombe Wanderers, it was announced that the winger had signed for Ebbsfleet United until the end of the 2008–09 season. The following day Duncan made his debut for Ebbsfleet in their 1–0 home league win over Rushden & Diamonds.

Duncan signed for AFC Wimbledon on 15 June 2009, but after one season at Kingsmeadow he signed for former club Ebbsfleet, on 6 July 2010.

On 29 July 2011, it was announced he had signed for Conference South side Woking.

At the start of 2012–13 season he signed for Conference South side Maidenhead United.

Isthmian League side VCD Athletic recruited Duncan for the 2016–17 season. He featured throughout the first part of the season, before picking up a straight-red card sending off on 1 January 2017 versus local rivals Phoenix Sports.

References

External links

1987 births
Living people
English footballers
Association football wingers
Leyton Orient F.C. players
Lewes F.C. players
Grays Athletic F.C. players
Wycombe Wanderers F.C. players
Ebbsfleet United F.C. players
AFC Wimbledon players
Woking F.C. players
Maidenhead United F.C. players
Thamesmead Town F.C. players
English Football League players
National League (English football) players
Isthmian League players
Footballers from Upton Park, London